The 1999-2000 Brown Bears women's ice hockey team represented Brown University.

Regular season
Courtney Johnson played her first season with Brown. In 1998, she suffered a knee injury and missed the season. For the season, she registered seventeen points (nine goals and eight assists). 
Kristy Zamora had twenty-one points (twelve goals and nine assists). Of her 12 goals, four were scored in ECAC and AWCHA Tournament play.

Awards and honors
Ali Brewer, 2000 ECAC Tournament Most Valuable Player 
Courtney Johnson: Ivy League Rookie of the Week on March 7 (part of the recognition included two goals versus Princeton) 
Courtney Johnson: Sakuma Award winner (based on perfect attendance at all practices and games).
Kristy Zamora: Ivy League Player of the Week on December 13 (she scored two goals versus Harvard, resulting in a 4-4 tie) 
Kristy Zamora: Sakuma Award winner

References

External links
Official site

Brown Bears women's ice hockey seasons
1999–2000 NCAA Division I women's hockey season
Brown
Brown